Dorcadion aries is a species of beetle in the family Cerambycidae. It was described by Tomé and Berger in 1999. It is known from Spain.

See also 
Dorcadion

References

aries
Beetles described in 1999